Epigonus elegans is a species of fish in the family Epigonidae found in the Southeast Pacific on the seamounts in the Nazca Ridge.

References 

 On the Revision of the Genus Epigonus, Rafinesque (Perciformes, Epigonidae): Species from the Seamounts of the Southeastern Pacific and a Preliminary Review of ... NV Parin, AA Abramov, Tr. Inst. Okeanol. im. PP Shirshova, Akad. Nauk SSSR, 1986
 Two new species of the bathypelagic fishes of the genus .. NV Parin, AA Abramov, 1986
 Abramov, A.A., 1992. Species composition and distribution of Epigonus (Epigonidae) in the world ocean. J. Ichthyol. 32(5), pages 94–108

Fish of the Pacific Ocean
Fish described in 1986
Epigonidae